The Canton of Saillagouse is a French former canton of the Pyrénées-Orientales department, in the Languedoc-Roussillon region. It had 10,770 inhabitants (2012). It was disbanded following the French canton reorganisation which came into effect in March 2015. It consisted of 21 communes, which joined the new canton of Les Pyrénées catalanes in 2015.

The canton comprised the following communes:

Saillagouse
Angoustrine-Villeneuve-des-Escaldes
Bourg-Madame
Dorres
Égat
Enveitg
Err
Estavar
Eyne
Font-Romeu-Odeillo-Via
Latour-de-Carol
Llo
Nahuja
Osséja
Palau-de-Cerdagne
Porta
Porté-Puymorens
Sainte-Léocadie
Targassonne
Ur
Valcebollère

References

Saillagouse
2015 disestablishments in France
States and territories disestablished in 2015